Edward J. Cahill, S.J. (18 February 1868–16 July 1941) was an Irish Jesuit priest and academic, born in Ballyvocogue, Cappagh, County Limerick. He was educated in Theology at Maynooth, and ordained a priest in 1897. He served on the staff of Mungret College and in the years before  the Easter Rising he was known for facilitating Irish Volunteers in their training in Mungret. In 1924, he joined the staff of the Jesuit Milltown Park Institute in Dublin as Professor of Church History, Lecturer in Sociology, and later, Spiritual Father.

In October 1926, on the occasion of the first celebration of the Feast of Christ the King, he founded "An Ríoghacht", the League of the Kingship of Christ. The object of this society was to ensure the use of Catholic Social Teaching in the Irish Free State. "An Ríoghacht", under Fr. Cahill's guidance, organised public meetings three or four times a year, published pamphlets on current topics and even attempted to produce a weekly paper to further its ideals. This organisation would go on to form the basis of Fr. Denis Fahey's Maria Duce.

Cahill's anti-mason message, delivered in the 1920s and 1930s, also served as an analysis and apologetic against Talmudic Judaism. In his works he cites papal teaching which describes the Masons as enemies of the Catholic Church, and gives evidence that these same Masons are influenced and given guidance by Jews: 

He was a regular contributor the Irish Ecclesiastical Record and the Irish Monthly. His works often stressed the link between Catholicism and nationalism.

He died on 16 July 1941, aged 73, after a long illness.

Bibliography
Books
The Abbot of Mungret, a play in 4 acts. (1925);
Freemasonry and the anti-Christian Movement Dublin: M.H. Gill & Son,  1929, 1930 2nd ed., rev. and enl. 
The Framework of the Christian State (1932) reprinted. available online in pdf format

Pamphlets
The Truth about Freemasonry (Australian C.T.S.)
The Catholic Social Movement (Irish Messenger Office)
Rural Secondary Schools (I.M.O.)
Ireland and the Kingship of Christ (I.M.O.)
The Oldest Nation in Europe (I.M.O.)
Ireland as a Catholic Nation (I.M.O.)
Ireland's Peril (Messrs. Gill)
Capitalism and its Alternatives (I.C.T.S.).

References

External links
 The Ireland of Edward Cahill (1868–1941): a liberal or a Christian state? at History Ireland

1868 births
1941 deaths
20th-century Irish Jesuits
Alumni of St Patrick's College, Maynooth
Antisemitism in Ireland
19th-century Irish Jesuits